The EHF European Cup is an annual men's handball club competition organised by the European Handball Federation (EHF). It is the third-tier competition of European club handball, after the EHF Champions League and the EHF European League. Founded in 1993 as the EHF City Cup, it was renamed EHF Challenge Cup in 2000, and EHF European Cup from the 2020–21 season.

History
Before 2000, it was called EHF City Cup. Currently, the EHF coefficient rank decides which teams have access and in which stage they enter.

Winners

EHF City Cup

EHF Challenge Cup

EHF European Cup 

 The first leg was canceled due to the flooding in Serbia, and the final was disputed in only one game.
 Both finals held in Chalkida, Greece, due to the COVID-19 pandemic in Sweden.

Performances

By teams

By countries

See also
 EHF Champions League
 EHF European League

References

External links
Official website

 
European Handball Federation competitions
Recurring sporting events established in 1993
Multi-national professional sports leagues